Andover New Street Football Club is a football club based in Andover, Hampshire, England.

History
The club was established in the 1890s as St Mary's Youth by the vicar of St Mary's Church, before being renamed New Street in 1895. After disbanding during the 1950s, the club was reformed in 1961. They played in the Andover & District League, before moving up to the North Hants League. In 1976 the club joined Division Four of the Hampshire League, which they won at the first attempt, earning promotion to Division Three. The club went on to win Division Three the following season and were promoted to Division Two.

When the Wessex League was formed in 1986, several clubs left the Hampshire League and New Street were promoted to Division One. They finished bottom of Division One in 1989–90 and were relegated to Division Two. The following season saw the club relegated again as they finished second-from-bottom of Division Two. However, they were Division Three runners-up in 1991–92 to secure an immediate promotion back to Division Two. The club finished as runners-up in Division Two the following season and were promoted back to Division One.

Division One was renamed the Premier Division in 1999, and in 2001 the club was renamed Andover New Street. They were Premier Division runners-up in 2003–04 and also won the League Cup. However, it was the final season of the Hampshire League, as it merged into the Wessex League, with the club becoming members of the new Division Two, which was renamed Division One in 2006. They were Division One runners-up in 2017–18, earning promotion to the Premier Division, as well as winning the North Hants Senior Cup and the Andover Open Cup.

The following season saw the club compete in the FA Cup for the first time. Although they finished bottom of the Premier Division and were relegated back to Division One, they retained both the Andover Open Cup and North Hants Senior Cup.

Ground
After being reformed in 1961, the club played at Walled Meadow, the ground of Andover. They later moved to London Road and the Drove before relocating to Foxcotte Park in 1992.

Honours
Hampshire League
Division Three champions 1977–78
Division Four champions 1976–77
League Cup winners 2003–04
North Hants Senior Cup
Winners 2017–18, 2018-19
Andover Open Cup
Winners 2017–18, 2018-19

Records
Best FA Cup performance: Preliminary round, 2018–19, 2019–20
Best FA Vase performance: Second qualifying round 2004–05, 2005–06, 2006–07, 2007–08, 2008–09, 2011–12
Record attendance: 532 vs Portsmouth, Hampshire Senior Cup second round, 19 September 2018

References

External links
Official website

Football clubs in England
Football clubs in Hampshire
1890s establishments in England
Association football clubs established in the 19th century
Andover, Hampshire
Andover and District Football League
North Hants League
Hampshire League
Wessex Football League